Korintus Koliopas Fingkreuw, better known as Korinus Fingkreuw (born 14 February 1983) is an Indonesian football winger who currently plays for Persidafon Dafonsoro in Indonesia Super League. Fingkreuw signed for Persipura in 2004, having come through their youth system. He has worked in the past with the Indonesian under-21 squad .In 2006, he moved to Sriwijaya FC along with his coach Rahmad Darmawan. In 2009, he signed with Persebaya Surabaya.

Good performance in the final of Liga Indonesia 2005, with one goal in the second half made the score a draw 2-2 against Persija, and the match had to be continued into extra time. In the extra time Persipura made another goal to win the Liga Indonesia title.

Fingkreuw was chosen for the Indonesian national team in Sea Games 2005, but the team failed to go to the semifinals.

Honours

Club honors
Persipura Jayapura
Liga Indonesia (1): 2005

Sriwijaya FC
Liga Indonesia (1): 2007–08
Copa Indonesia (2): 2007–08, 2008–09

References

Indonesian footballers
Association football wingers
1983 births
Living people
Indonesian Christians
Competitors at the 2005 Southeast Asian Games
Persipura Jayapura players
Sriwijaya F.C. players
Persebaya Surabaya players
PSM Makassar players
Persidafon Dafonsoro players
People from Jayapura
Sportspeople from Papua
Southeast Asian Games competitors for Indonesia